Tim Thornton may refer to:
Tim Thornton (bishop) (born 1957), British Anglican Bishop of Truro and of Sherborne
Tim Thornton (philosopher) (born 1966), English philosopher and academic
Tim Thornton (musician, born 1973), English drummer, guitarist, composer and novelist
Tim Thornton (musician, born 1988), English jazz double bassist, leader of Tim Thornton Quartet